Callia is a genus of longhorn beetles of the subfamily Lamiinae.

 Callia albicornis Bates, 1885
 Callia ambigua Bates, 1885
 Callia annulata Galileo & Martins, 2002
 Callia apyra Martins & al., 2010
 Callia argodi Belon, 1903
 Callia axillaris (Dalman, 1823)
 Callia azurea Audinet-Serville, 1835
 Callia batesi Blackwelder, 1946
 Callia bella Galileo & Martins, 1992
 Callia bicolor (Breuning, 1960)
 Callia boliviana Belon, 1903
 Callia bordoni Martins & al., 2010
 Callia catuaba Martins & al., 2010
 Callia chrysomelina Pascoe, 1859
 Callia comitessa Melzer, 1930
 Callia criocerina Bates, 1866
 Callia cyanea Melzer, 1931
 Callia divisa Galileo & Martins, 2002
 Callia flavipes Zajciw, 1958
 Callia fulvocincta Bates, 1866
 Callia gallegoi Galileo & Martins, 1991
 Callia guyanensis Martins & Galileo, 2008
 Callia halticoides (Bates, 1866)
 Callia leucozonata Lane, 1973
 Callia lineatula Lane, 1973
 Callia lissonota Galileo & Martins, 2002
 Callia lycoides Bates, 1866
 Callia marginata Galileo & Martins, 2002
 Callia metallica Galileo & Martins, 2008
 Callia oby Martins & al., 2010
 Callia pallida Martins & al., 2010
 Callia paraguaya Galileo & Martins, 2002
 Callia potiaiuba Martins & Galileo, 2006
 Callia pulchra Melzer, 1930
 Callia punctata Galileo & Martins, 2002
 Callia purpureipennis (Gistel, 1848)
 Callia rubristerna Galileo & Martins, 1992
 Callia simplex Galileo & Martins, 1991
 Callia terminata Martins & al., 2010
 Callia tomentosa Galileo & Martins, 2002
 Callia tristis Galileo & Martins, 2002
 Callia variabilis Martins & al., 2010
 Callia xanthomera Redtenbacher, 1867

References

Calliini
Cerambycidae genera